Stuðlagil (also transliterated as Studlagil) is a ravine in   in the municipality of Múlaþing, in the Eastern Region of Iceland. It is known for its columnar basalt rock formations and the blue-green water that runs through it. It became an unexpected tourist sensation  after being shown in a WOW air brochure in 2017.

The river Jökla runs through the ravine. The water level decreased by  after the opening of the Kárahnjúkar Hydropower Plant in 2009.

See also 
 List of columnar basalts in Iceland

References

External links 
 Official website

Ravines
Landforms of Iceland
Eastern Region (Iceland)
Columnar basalts in Iceland